The Wars of the Roses (1455–1487) were a series of dynastic civil wars fought in Medieval England.

War(s) of the Roses also may refer to:

Arts and entertainment
 Shakespeare-related:
 The War of the Roses (Shakespeare), a modern-day play cycle based on Shakespeare's history plays
 The Wars of the Roses (adaptation), 1963 adaptation of several of Shakespeare's history plays
 Narratives about 20th-century divorce:
 The War of the Roses (novel), a 1981 novel by Warren Adler
 The War of the Roses (film), a 1989 American film based on the novel, starring Michael Douglas and Kathleen Turner
 War of the Roses (radio show), a live entertainment program, created 1994 that catches cheaters in relationships
 Wars of the Roses (album), a 2011 studio album by the band Ulver
 War of the Roses (video game), a 2012 action video game based on the dynastic civil wars
 Wars of the Roses, a series of historical novels by Conn Iggulden

"War of the Roses" competitions

England
 Wars of the Roses (air race) (1913), Leeds
 Roses Match or "The War of the Roses", any game of cricket between Yorkshire County Cricket Club and Lancashire County Cricket Club, first played in 1849
 Rugby League War of the Roses, rugby league matches between Lancashire and Yorkshire, beginning 1895 
 Roses Tournament, annual sports competition between Lancaster University and the University of York

Other places
 War of the Roses (Pennsylvania), sports competitions between the neighboring cities of York and Lancaster, Pennsylvania, United States

Other uses
 "The War of the Roses", 1886 campaign for governor of Tennessee (US), contested between brothers
 "War of the Roses", 2016 Spanish Socialist Workers' Party leadership crisis